Sybil Morrison (2 January 1893 – 26 April 1984) was a British pacifist and a suffragist who was active with several other radical causes.

As a young and enthusiastic suffragist, Morrison was persuaded by Emmeline Pankhurst that she was too young to go to prison.  During World War I, she began in 1916 to drive ambulances in London and attributed her decision to become a pacifist to the sight of a Zeppelin being shot down over the town of Potters Bar: "In the streets of London, ordinary, decent people were clapping and cheering and dancing as though at a play or a circus.... I suddenly saw that war made yet another impact on human beings; it deprived them of their humanity. I became a pacifist then and nothing has happened since to alter my conviction that war is a crime against God and humanity".

Morrison became in 1936 one of the first women members of the Peace Pledge Union (PPU), a British pacifist organisation, and the British section of War Resisters International (WRI). She served as a Campaign Organiser and Chair and wrote the first history of the PPU. In 1940, she spent a month in Holloway Prison for having spoken against the war at London's Speakers' Corner. Morrison was an active member of the Women's International League for Peace & Freedom (WILPF) and was at one stage the Chair of its British branch.

Sybil Morrison was the secretary of the short-lived Women's Peace Campaign, set up by the PPU at the end of 1939. It had been hoped to obtain the signatures of one million women against the Second World War, but as Morrison admitted, "The invasion of Scandinavia has, of course, made it much more difficult now to approach people about signing an appeal for negotiations because opinion is hardening against the pacifist. The Campaign was doomed after the surrender of the French in June, 1940 but the collapse may also have had something to do with the opposition of John Middleton Murry, editor of Peace News. Murry was described as having a "frightful" attitude towards women and was not at all supportive of the campaign".

Morrison was the Organising Secretary and Chair of the Six Point Group (c.1948-1950). It campaigned for legislation on assault against children, on support for widows, on legislation in support of unmarried mothers and on issues of equal rights and equal pay. Another member of the Group was Dora Russell, the second wife of Bertrand Russell.

Morrison was also active with the Howard League for Penal Reform and the National Peace Council. She was a vice-president of the Fellowship Party, a small British political party that attracted many peace activists.

She was a close friend of the leading peace activists Donald Soper and Fenner Brockway and the pacifist actress Sybil Thorndike; they each referred to "the other Sybil". She was a lesbian who was once described as "the most famous dyke in London". For the last few years of her life, she shared a house with Myrtle Solomon, who was the general secretary of the Peace Pledge Union and later the chair of WRI. In the 1930s, she had a relationship with another suffragist, Dorothy Evans, which was considered shocking at the time.

Other people with whom Morrison worked included Vera Brittain, Alex Comfort, Laurence Housman, Hugh Brock and Kathleen Lonsdale and many other leading individuals in radical politics during much of the 20th century. Even towards the end of her life, she took an active interest in politics and turned up at the beginning of a march against the Falklands War.

See also
List of peace activists

References

British women in World War I
British anti-war activists
English suffragists
British pacifists
1984 deaths
1893 births
English LGBT people
Lesbians
20th-century LGBT people